The 1946 football season was São Paulo's 17th season since the club's founding in 1930.

Overall

{|class="wikitable"
|-
|Games played || 37 (20 Campeonato Paulista, 17 Friendly match)
|-
|Games won || 29 (17 Campeonato Paulista, 12 Friendly match)
|-
|Games drawn || 4 (3 Campeonato Paulista, 1 Friendly match)
|-
|Games lost || 4 (0 Campeonato Paulista, 4 Friendly match)
|-
|Goals scored || 121
|-
|Goals conceded || 50
|-
|Goal difference || +71
|-
|Best result || 7–0 (A) v Juventus - Campeonato Paulista - 1946.10.26
|-
|Worst result || 1–2 (A) v Palmeiras - Friendly match - 1946.03.17  1–2 (H) v Fluminense - Friendly match - 1946.04.23  1–2 (A) v Portuguesa Santista - Friendly match - 1946.11.24  1–2 (H) v River Plate - Friendly match - 1946.12.15
|-
|Most appearances || 
|-
|Top scorer || 
|-

Friendlies

Official competitions

Campeonato Paulista

Record

External links
official website 

Association football clubs 1946 season
1946
1946 in Brazilian football